Usuf Rehman Chippa (20 January 1920 – 18 November 1975) played first-class cricket from 1937 to 1955 and represented India and Pakistan, but did not play Test cricket.

A slow left-arm orthodox spin bowler, Usuf Chippa made his first-class debut in 1937-38 at the age of 17 for Gujarat in a Ranji Trophy match against Bombay, taking 5 for 23 in the first innings. In the 1939-40 Ranji Trophy he took 6 for 45 and 3 for 48 against Baroda. In 1940-41 he represented India in the second of their two matches against the touring Ceylon team, taking 5 for 38 in the first innings of an innings victory for India.

Chippa moved to Pakistan after Partition. He toured Ceylon in 1948-49 with the Pakistan team, playing in both of the international matches. The next season he was selected to play for Pakistan in the two matches against the touring Ceylon team in 1949-50. In the second match he took 2 for 33 and 5 for 53 in a 10-wicket victory for Pakistan. He continued playing in Pakistan for some years but was unable to break into the Test team after Pakistan achieved Test status in 1952.

References

External links

1920 births
1975 deaths
Cricketers from Ahmedabad
Indian cricketers
Gujarat cricketers
Muslims cricketers
Western India cricketers
Karachi cricketers
Pakistani people of Gujarati descent